Trosia xinga is a moth of the Megalopygidae family. It was described by Paul Dognin in 1922.

References

Moths described in 1922
Megalopygidae